Than Phu Ying Sirikitiya Jensen (born March 18, 1985), or Sirikittiya Mai Jensen, born Mai Jensen, is a granddaughter of King Bhumibol Adulyadej of Thailand and a niece  of King Vajiralongkorn of Thailand. She is a daughter of Princess Ubolratana Rajakanya (the King's eldest daughter) and her American former husband Peter Ladd Jensen. She is also known by her birth name and nickname as Khun Mai.

Early life 
Sirikitiya is the youngest of three children. Her older sister is Than Phu Ying Ploypailin, and her older brother was Khun Poom. Sirikitiya and her siblings grew up in San Diego, California, United States. She and her brother attended Torrey Pines High School, a public school. After their parents' divorce in 1998, Princess Ubolratana and Poom moved back to Thailand in July 2001. Sirikitiya stayed in San Diego with her father and graduated from high school in 2003.

Education 
Jensen attended University of California, Riverside. She graduated from New York University (class of 2007), majoring in East Asian studies, with a focus on the histories of Japan and China.

Works and interests 
After graduation she has worked in fashion as an apprentice of Japanese designer Yohji Yamamoto and working with Hermes because she wants to be creative while working and see fashion as the most fun thing. Later, work independently by opening a website that combines advertising websites. Thanpuying Sirikitiya has been interested in the curatorial work at the Metropolitan Museum of Art since working at Hermes.

After returning to live in Thailand therefore attend an internship in the conservation academic group Office of Architecture, The Fine Arts Department since September 2016, and after the internship was completed, was appointed as a government official at Level 3 of the said department since May 1, 2017, in the position of operative arts officer of Historical group, Office of Literature and History temporary duty at the Office of Architecture, Department of Fine Arts. In 2017, Thanpuying Sirikitiya was responsible for the construction of the royal cremation ceremony for the royal cremation ceremony of His Majesty King Bhumibol Adulyadej the Great as a civil servant. Later in the year 2018, Thanpuying Sirikitiya was the project director of "Wang Na Nimit", which collects and disseminates information about the Front Palace which is exhibited using visual language technology she said about the history of this exhibition that "This exhibition was made with the intention of wanting the young generation to see how history and the present go together. And to feel that history is not far from you."

In July 2018, Thanpuying Sirikitiya visited the important historical sites in Songkhla such as Songkhla National Museum, Khao Tang Kuan, Ko Yo, Thaksin Case Studies Institute, Wat Matchimawat and the Islamic Muslim Mosque to promote and push Songkhla as a world heritage city.

On 6 March to 28 April 2019, Thanpuying Sirikitiya, together with Natali Butang and Mary Pansanga, organized the project "Wang Na Narumit" and the exhibition "Implicit plane outside ins Two: transforming the past into the present" at the Issara Palace, The Bangkok National Museum to learn about the title Front Palace but this time, added a piece of 20 outstanding people from different circles and one choir Create a work that represents the palace as the aptitude and exhibition.

Ancestry

Notes

References 

Sirikitiya Jensen
1985 births
Living people
American people of Thai descent
American people of Danish descent
Sirikitiya Jensen
Sirikitiya Jensen
New York University alumni